This List of Louisiana state historic sites contains the 17 state historic sites governed by the Office of State Parks, a division of Louisiana Department of Culture, Recreation and Tourism in the U.S. state of Louisiana, as of 2011.  State historic sites were formerly known as state commemorative areas until July 1, 1999 with the passing of House Bill No. 462, which renamed them to state historic sites.

2010 budget cuts
Due to state budget cuts in 2010, Los Adaes and Winter Quarters State Historic Site were placed on 'caretaker status'.  Later in the year on July 26, five more historic sites were put on caretaker status.  These sites included Centenary SHS, Fort Jesup, Fort Pike, Marksville, and Plaquemine Lock.

Fort Jesup State Historic Site was removed from the list on November 12, 2010 with support from the town of Many, The Sabine River Authority, and parish tourism officials. Plaquemine Lock State Historic Site was reopened on January 5, 2011 with help of the local government.  However, funds for Centenary State Historic Site, also in Jackson, weren't obtained to open it along with Plaquemine Lock State Historic Site. While the boat launch of Fort Pike reopened to the public on January 11, 2011, the historic site itself is still under caretaker status and available by appointment only.

State historic sites

Former state historic sites
The following were once Louisiana state historic sites, but for one reason or another are no longer current state historic sites.

See also

List of Louisiana state parks
Louisiana State Arboretum

References

External links

 Louisiana State Historic Sites

 
State historic sites